The alkali denaturation test, also known as A or Apt test, is a medical test used to differentiate fetal or neonatal blood from maternal blood found in a newborn's stool or vomit,  or from maternal vaginal blood.

History
The test was developed by Leonard Apt (1922–2013), an American pediatric ophthalmologist. The test was originally used to identify the source of bloody stools in newborn infants. It has been modified to distinguish fetal from maternal hemoglobin in blood samples from any source.

Uses
The Apt test is most commonly used in cases of vaginal bleeding late during pregnancy (antepartum haemorrhage) to determine if the bleeding is from the mother or the fetus. 
 A positive test would indicate that blood is of fetal origin, and could be due to vasa previa.
 A negative test indicates that the blood is of maternal origin.

In practice, the Apt test may not be done when there is suspicion of vasa previa, because the time to fetal collapse with bleeding from vasa previa is often very short.

The Apt test can also be used to detect the presence of fetal blood in the maternal circulation in cases of suspected fetal-maternal hemorrhage. Since the test is only a qualitative determination of the presence of fetal hemoglobin in maternal blood, the quantitative Kleihauer-Betke test is more commonly used.

Finally, the Apt test can be used after birth (postpartum hemorrhage) if the newborn has bloody vomiting, bloody stool, or active bleeding from the nasogastric tube. A positive apt test would mean that the blood is either due to gastrointestinal or pulmonary bleeding from the neonate. A negative Apt test would indicate that the blood is of maternal origin, suggesting that the neonate swallowed or aspirated maternal blood, either during delivery or during breastfeeding (e.g., from breast fissures).

Theory
The test is based on differences between maternal and fetal hemoglobin. Maternal blood contains adult hemoglobin composed of two alpha and two beta subunits (aka hemoglobin A or HbA; i.e., normal adult hemoglobin). Fetal blood contains fetal hemoglobin composed of two alpha and two gamma subunits (aka hemoglobin F or HbF; i.e., normal fetal hemoglobin). This difference in composition gives the different types of hemoglobin different chemical properties (in addition to the higher affinity HbF has for dissolved blood oxygen over HbA, allowing baby to extract oxygen from the mother's blood). Fetal hemoglobin is resistant to alkali (basic) denaturation, whereas adult hemoglobin is susceptible to such denaturation. Therefore, exposing the blood specimen to sodium hydroxide (NaOH) will denature the adult but not the fetal hemoglobin. The fetal hemoglobin will appear as a pinkish color under the microscope while the adult hemoglobin will appear as a yellow-brownish color.

Method
The blood is mixed with a small amount of sterile water to cause hemolysis of the RBCs, yielding free hemoglobin. The sample is next centrifuged for several minutes. The pink hemoglobin-containing supernatant is then mixed with 1 mL of 1% NaOH for each 5 mL of supernatant. The color of the fluid is assessed after 2 minutes. Fetal hemoglobin will stay pink and adult hemoglobin will turn yellow-brown since adult hemoglobin is less stable and will convert to hematin which has a hydroxide ligand.

See also
 Kleihauer-Betke test

References

Further reading
 Heath, K. Abruptio Placentae. in 5-Minute Clinical Consult, 15th ed. Domino, FJ editor. Lipponcott Williams & Wilkins, Philadelphia, PA. 2007.
 
 
 Lab Tests and Results: Apt-Downey test and 

Blood tests
Tests during pregnancy